Baldwin County may refer to:

 Baldwin County, Alabama
 Baldwin County, Georgia